5-Methylindole is an irritating organic compound with chemical formula 
.  5-Methylindole is used as an intermediate in the synthesis of compounds with a variety of pharmacological properties, such as staurosporine-like bisindole inhibitors of protein kinases.

References 

Methylindoles